Water dropwort is a common name for several genera of plants and may refer to:
 Oenanthe (plant)
 Oxypolis
 Tiedemannia